The three circles is an exercise / diagram used by recovering addicts to describe and define behaviors that lead either to a relapse into or recovery from addictive behaviors. Some treatment groups and 12-step recovery programs encourage recovering addicts to complete the three circle exercise to help the addict identify behaviors that promote or endanger their sobriety. The first use of the term is found in a pamphlet publication of Sex Addicts Anonymous, entitled "Three circles: Defining sobriety in S.A.A." Minneapolis, MN: SAA Literature (1991). It has since been republished.

When creating the three circles diagram, the addict draws three concentric circles, one inside the other (like a bull's eye). The addict then lists behaviors in each of the circles that reset, endanger or promote their sobriety.

Inner Circle
The addict lists behaviors they want to stop engaging in in the inner-most circle. Engaging in any of these "inner circle" or "bottom-line" behaviors would result in a loss of sobriety for the addict. Addicts typically consider their "sobriety date" to be the last day they engaged in these "inner circle" behaviors.

Middle Circle
The addict then lists "middle line" or "boundary behaviors" in the second or "middle circle." These include behaviors that may or may not be appropriate but lead to the bottom line behaviors listed in the inner circle. Examples of middle-circle behaviors include not getting enough sleep, overwork, procrastination, etc.

Outer CircleFinally, the addict list their "top lines" or healthy behaviors in the "outer circle." These "outer circle" behaviors lead the addict away from the objectionable behavior listed in the inner circle. Examples include going to a recovery meeting, calling one's sponsor or other person in the addict's support group, spiritual reading, recovery writing, etc.

This visual image of three circles can help addicts realize when they are in trouble and what they need to do to move closer to their definition of a healthy behavior.

Top lines
Addicts speak of top lines to prevent approaching doing something which may trigger a slip, relapse or loss of sobriety.

As addicts work with sponsors to help them understand their addiction and the behaviors which trigger their addiction or actions which endanger their sobriety, they form a list of things which tip them off that they are in danger. Top lines are flags on the edge of minefield. The mines are bottom line behaviour.

Bottom lines
Bottom line behaviour is any sexual or emotional or physical act which, once engaged in, leads to loss of control of the addictive process.

There are warning signs sometimes called mid-lines, or accessory behaviors, which warn the addict that s/he may be engaging in behaviour which may lead to loss of sobriety.

An example of mid-line behaviour for a Sex Addict might be cruising the streets or looking at the covers of pornographic magazines. These behaviours can lead to loss of sobriety.

References

Drug rehabilitation